Governor Quinn may refer to:

Pat Quinn (politician) (born 1948), 41st Governor of Illinois
Robert E. Quinn (1894–1975), 58th Governor of Rhode Island
William F. Quinn (1919–2006), 12th Governor of the Territory of Hawaii and 1st Governor of Hawaii